The 1986–87 Magyar Kupa (English: Hungarian Cup) was the 47th season of Hungary's annual knock-out cup football competition.

Quarter-finals
Games were played on April 1 and April 15, 1987.

|}

Quarter-finals
Games were played on May 27 and June 10, 1987.

|}

Final

See also
 1986–87 Nemzeti Bajnokság I

References

External links
 Official site 
 soccerway.com

1986–87 in Hungarian football
1986–87 domestic association football cups
1986-87